Tko želi biti milijunaš? (English translation: Who wants to be a millionaire?, usually called Milijunaš) is a Croatian game show based on the original British format of Who Wants to Be a Millionaire?. The show is hosted by Tarik Filipović. The main goal of the game is to win the top prize (1 million kn from 2002 to 2022, €150,000 as of January 5, 2023) by answering 15 multiple-choice questions correctly. There are 4 "lifelines", which are ways for a player to get help during the game.  They are 50/50 (pola pola) (2002–present), phone a friend (zovi) (2002–present), ask the audience (pitaj publiku) (2002–2020, 2022-) and an additional lifeline three wise men (tri znalca) (2020–2022). The game show was broadcast from 2002 to 2008 and from September 2009 to June 2010. It was shown on the Croatian TV station HRT1. From 2002 to 2022, when a contestant got the fifth question correct, he left with at least 1,000 kn. When a contestant got the tenth question correct, he left with at least 32,000 kn. As of January 5, 2023, When a contestant got the fifth question correct, he left with at least €150. When a contestant got the tenth question correct, he left with at least €5,000.

The show returned at HRT1 in September 2019. Tarik Filipović is once again the host of the show. The show air's on Thursdays in the television primetime. Minor changes to the show have been underdone, but there were no bigger changes to the quiz format itself. The "zovi" lifeline has been shortened down to 25 seconds from 30, due to increased availability and faster speed of internet search engines, such as Google. The choice of contestants for "najbrži prst" has been cut down to 6 contestants from original 10. An additional lifeline "tri znalca" (three wise men) has been added in 2020 to substitute "pitaj publiku" (ask the audience) for the rest of the season due to coronavirus situation.

This version is also the second country to adapt the new International Rave graphics which were created by Olga Van Den Brandt.

Payout structure

Top prize winners

Only one contestant won the top prize, Mira Bićanić, on June 14, 2003. She used her "Ask the Audience" lifeline on the final question and then decided to give the final answer, which was correct. The million HRK question has been opened 15 times so far (as of September 27, 2019).

References

Who Wants to Be a Millionaire?
Croatian television series
2002 Croatian television series debuts
2010 Croatian television series endings
Croatian Radiotelevision original programming

hr:Tko želi biti milijunaš?